N57, or rijksweg 57, is a 77 km long national road in the provinces of South Holland and Zeeland in the Netherlands. It is also known as the dammenroute (Route of dams). 

The N57 connects the city and the major port of Rotterdam with Middelburg and other coastal towns in Zeeland and southern South Holland.

Trivia 
The second stage of the 2015 Tour de France took place on a large part of the N57, with the finish at Neeltje Jans.

References

Motorways in the Netherlands
Motorways in South Holland
Motorways in Zeeland